Carposina maritima is a moth in the Carposinidae family. It was described by Ponomarenko in 1999. It is found in the Russian Far East.

The wingspan is 13-15.5 mm. The groundcolour of the forewings is white, with a pattern consisting of seven indistinct grey strokes on the costal margin and five concolorous small spots at the end of the veins on the termen and a grey spot at the end of the cell. The hindwings are grey in males and light-grey in females.

References

Natural History Museum Lepidoptera generic names catalog

Carposinidae
Moths described in 1999
Moths of Asia